The following lists events that happened in 1964 in Iceland.

Incumbents
President – Ásgeir Ásgeirsson
Prime Minister – Bjarni Benediktsson

Events
 16 July - Prince Philip, Duke of Edinburgh and his son the Prince of Wales (now Charles III) visited Reykjavik
 17 August - Liverpool FC play their first match in Iceland, beating KR Reykjavik 5-0
 20 September - One of three single-engine planes en route from Halifax to Europe ditches in the sea off Iceland.  The pilot is rescued by helicopter.  Another is lost entirely and the third lands safely in Reykjavik.
 4 November - Prime Minister Bjarni Benediktsson paid a visit to Israel and met with Israeli Prime Minister Levi Eshkol.

Births

22 January – María Ellingsen, actress
27 January – Geir Sveinsson, handball player.
23 April – Halla Margrét Árnadóttir, singer 
27 April – Thorir Hergeirsson, handballer
2 August – Einar Thor, film director
24 August – Svandís Svavarsdóttir, politician
10 November – Magnús Scheving, writer, actor and entrepreneur

Deaths

References

 
1960s in Iceland
Iceland
Iceland
Years of the 20th century in Iceland